Amílcar Henríquez Espinosa (August 2, 1983 – April 15, 2017) was a Panamanian footballer.

Club career
Born in Panama City, Henríquez began his club career with local side Árabe Unido. He spent one season with Costa Rica with Santacruceña before moving to Colombia in 2009. He became an important player for Atlético Huila and joined Independiente Medellín in July 2012. After a season back at Árabe Unido, he returned to Colombia to play for second division side Real Cartagena in December 2014.

In March 2015, Henríquez was released by Cartagena due to alleged indiscipline and in June 2015 he was snapped up by América Cali. In 2016, he returned to Árabe Unido.

International career
Henríquez made his debut for Panama in a February 2005 UNCAF Nations Cup match against El Salvador and has, as of 10 June 2015, earned a total of 85 caps, scoring no goals. He represented his country in 15 FIFA World Cup qualification matches and played at the 2007, 2009 and 2011 CONCACAF Gold Cups.

His final international was a March 2017 qualification match for the 2018 FIFA World Cup against the United States.

Death
On 15 April 2017, Henríquez was killed in his hometown of Colón in a drive-by shooting. He was shot while leaving his house; two other people were also injured in the incident.

Árabe Unido decided to retire his jersey #21 in his honor.

See also
List of unsolved murders

Honors
Club
ANAPROF (2): 2004, 2008 (C)

National team
UNCAF Nations Cup: 1
 Winners: 2009
 Runner-up (1): 2007

References

External links

Profile at Possofutbol
Profile at Futbolextremo

1983 births
2005 UNCAF Nations Cup players
2007 CONCACAF Gold Cup players
2007 UNCAF Nations Cup players
2009 CONCACAF Gold Cup players
2009 UNCAF Nations Cup players
2011 CONCACAF Gold Cup players
2011 Copa Centroamericana players
2014 Copa Centroamericana players
2017 Copa Centroamericana players
2017 deaths
América de Cali footballers
Association football midfielders
Atlético Huila footballers
Categoría Primera A players
Categoría Primera B players
C.D. Árabe Unido players
Copa América Centenario players
Copa Centroamericana-winning players
Deaths by firearm in Panama
Expatriate footballers in Colombia
Expatriate footballers in Costa Rica
Independiente Medellín footballers
Male murder victims
Panamanian expatriate footballers
Panamanian footballers
Panamanian murder victims
Panama international footballers
People murdered in Panama
Real Cartagena footballers
Sportspeople from Panama City
Unsolved murders in Panama
2017 crimes in Panama
2010s murders in Panama